Ferdinand Postma was the first rector of the Potchefstroom University for Christian Higher Education, in Potchefstroom, South Africa.

Personal life

Postma was the second son of Marthinus Postma and Elizabeth Wilhelmina Josina Spiller. He was born on 15 July 1879 in Aliwal North, Eastern Cape Province, South Africa. In 1880 the family moved to Burgersdorp. Up till 1890 he went to school in Burgersdorp. In 1890 his father, a pastor moved to Middelburg and Postma attend the Christian school there. He passed standard 10 (grade 12) in 1896 in Burgersdorp. He passed the intermediate exam of the University of Good Hope in Cape Town. After the local war in South Africa  he studied with a bursary at the  Vrije Universiteit, Amsterdam, The Netherlands. Here he completed his Theological studies. In 1903 he obtained the qualification Litterarum Humaniorum Candidatus.  He was married to  Margaretha Jacoba Coetsee. He died in Potchefstroom on 4 November 1950.

Education

In January 1904 he became a professor in Literature at the Theological Centre of the Reformed Church in Potchefstroom. He was involved in the establishing of the first Afrikaans School in Potchefstroom, called Potchefstroom Gimnasium. In 1913 he studied further in Classical language in the Netherlands and obtained his PhD with the title:” De Numine Devino quid senserit Vergilius". In 1919 he became the first  rector of the Potchefstroom University for Christian Higher Education. From 1936–1938 he was chairman of the senate of University of South Africa.  An honoury PhD,  Doctor Educationis honoris was awarded to him by the University of South Africa.

Writer

He wrote the following books:
(Afrikaans) Hy het sy merk  gemaak. (Translated: He made his mark )
Kleopatra
(Afrikaans) Beknopte woordeboek: Afrikaans-Latyn / Latyn-Afrikaans (translated: Concised dictionary Afrikaans- Latin, Latin –Afrikaans)
(Afrikaans) Vuurpyle (translated: Rockets)
(Afrikaans) Paul Kruger: Christen-Volksman-Staatsman (translated: Paul Kruger, Christian, father of the Nation, Statesman)
(Afrikaans) Paulus, ’n geroepe apostel van Jesus Christus (translated: Paul a disciple of Jesus Christ)
(Afrikaans) Erfstukke uit die klassieke oudheid (translated: Classic inherited peaces)

Recognition

A high school in Potchefstroom is named after him and also the university library.

References 

1879 births
1950 deaths
Vrije Universiteit Amsterdam alumni
Academic staff of North-West University
South African male writers
Dutch Reformed Church in South Africa clergy
People from Potchefstroom
People from Aliwal North